Unfinished Business is the second album by hip hop duo EPMD. Released August 1, 1989 the album built upon the success of the group's previous album Strictly Business, which was released the previous year. The lead single, "So Wat Cha Sayin'," was the only charting single released from the album. It was the second album from the group to hit #1 on the Top R&B/Hip-Hop Albums chart.

The album was certified Gold by the RIAA on October 16, 1989. It was one of three albums that Priority/EMI Records acquired from Sleeping Bag Records when it ceased operations in 1991.

Reception
Trouser Press wrote that "the rudimentary self-production of Unfinished Business is its most engaging asset: Sermon and his largely silent partner Parrish Smith (the band’s acronym stands for Erick and Parrish Making Dollars) sound like a couple of kids fooling around in mom’s basement, rapping about nothing, singing a line or two, making cut-in jokes with some favorite records and generally amusing themselves while the tape runs."

In 1998, the album was selected as one of The Source'''s 100 Best Rap Albums and, in 2005, was ranked #7 on comedian Chris Rock's Top 25 Hip-Hop Albums of all-time list for Rolling Stone''.

Track listing
All songs produced by EPMD

Charts

Certifications

See also
List of number-one R&B albums of 1989 (U.S.)

References

1989 albums
EPMD albums
Albums produced by Erick Sermon
Fresh Records (US) albums
Priority Records albums